The 1995 Great Barrington tornado (also known as the Memorial Day Tornado of 1995) was an F4 tornado that occurred in the western Massachusetts town of Great Barrington.

Storm background
Around 3:30 p.m. (Eastern Daylight Time) on May 29, 1995, scattered thunderstorms developed over the Western Catskill Mountains of New York. Over the next few hours the storms moved east, only producing isolated wind and hail. One particular thunderstorm exploded into a supercell upon crossing the Hudson River Valley, due to the presence of higher dew points flowing up the valley from the south and locally enhanced low-level shear. A tornado touched down in Columbia County at 6:40 p.m., producing F2 damage. The tornado lifted off the ground twenty minutes later and the storm moved over the mountains along the New York/Massachusetts border. Shortly after crossing into Massachusetts, the storm dropped the violent Great Barrington, Massachusetts tornado. The F4 tornado touched down at 7:06 PM EDT, and lifted at 7:24 PM EDT.

The tornado and destruction
The tornado itself touched down around 7:06 p.m. in Great Barrington near the Walter J. Koladza Airport. Near the town line with Monterey, a car was lifted off of Route 23, and tossed  into a wooded area. More than 100 homes and businesses were either damaged or destroyed, including the grandstand at the Great Barrington Fairgrounds. Additionally, twenty-four people (or twenty-seven according to a different source) were injured.

The storm itself caused $25 million worth of damage. Three people were killed—two students and a staff member at the private Eagleton School—as they were returning to the campus in Great Barrington. The F4 rating is based entirely on the car that was thrown 1,000 feet. The worst structural damage from this tornado was in the F3 range. The rating of the tornado is sometimes disputed because of this.

See also

 Tornadoes of 1995
 List of North American tornadoes and tornado outbreaks

References

Bibliography

F4 tornadoes
Great Barrington tornado
Tornadoes in Massachusetts
Great Barrington tornado
Geography of Berkshire County, Massachusetts
History of Berkshire County, Massachusetts
Great Barrington, Massachusetts
Monterey, Massachusetts
Great Barrington tornado